Shrine Pass, elevation , is a mountain pass in the Sawatch Range of central Colorado.

It is traversed by a narrow unpaved road connecting the eastern side of Vail Pass near Interstate 70 (east) with the town of Red Cliff in the upper valley of the Eagle River (west). Most of the time, it is a 4WD or jeep trail; however, in ideal weather the road is considered traversable by sturdy 2WD vehicles and light trucks.

The pass was formerly the principal route between the upper valleys of the Blue and Eagle before the construction of U.S. Highway 6 over nearby Vail Pass, which subsequently became the main route.  The pass offers scenic view of wildflower meadows and pine woodlands during the summer and autumn months, as well as distant view of Mount of the Holy Cross to the north.  It is especially popular as a sightseeing route during the autumn months.

During the winter, it is a popular snowmobile and cross-country skiing route.  A car shuttle from the resort town of Vail in the Eagle Valley to the town of Red Cliff allows skiers to access the pass.  After a one-mile hike upwards, it is possible to descend a ten-mile course back down to the town of Red Cliff.

See also
Colorado mountain passes

References

Mountain passes of Colorado
Landforms of Eagle County, Colorado
Landforms of Summit County, Colorado
Transportation in Eagle County, Colorado
Transportation in Summit County, Colorado